KHTR (104.3 FM) is a commercial HD radio station in Pullman, Washington, broadcasting to the Pullman, Washington-Moscow, Idaho area. The main analog and HD1 signals air a country music format branded as "New Country 104-3".

HD Radio
KHTR was the first commercial station in the Pullman, Washington-Moscow, Idaho area with a licensed and operational HD Radio transmitter. simulcasting sister station KQQQ on their HD2 channel. They broadcast a format similar to the KQQQ news/talk format on their HD3 channel, which is modified for the Lewiston, ID and Clarkston, WA listening areas, and also carried on an FM translator covering the same listening areas.

In September 2019, KHTR HD2 started airing a classic hits format branded as "Hits 104.7", which airs on translator K284BW in Moscow, Idaho. It had previously been used to give sister station KQQQ an FM outlet. KQQQ programming is now aired on FM in the Pullman–Moscow area on its own translator at 102.1 FM.

KHTR is also a flagship station for Washington State Cougars football and men's basketball.

References

External links

HTR
Country radio stations in the United States
Pullman, Washington
Radio stations established in 1967